Brachyleptura champlaini is a species of beetle in the family Cerambycidae. It was described by Casey in 1913.

References
Citations

Sources
 Bugguide.net. Species Brachyleptura champlaini

Lepturinae
Beetles described in 1913